Guatteria calliantha is a species of plant in the Annonaceae family. It is endemic to Peru.

References

calliantha
Endemic flora of Peru
Vulnerable flora of South America
Taxonomy articles created by Polbot